Antoni Gałecki (4 June 1906 – 14 December 1958) was a Polish football player and defender who represented ŁKS Łódź. He also played on the Polish National Team during the 1936 Berlin Olympics and Poland's 1938 FIFA World Cup lone match against Brazil.

Born in Łódź, Galecki joined the LKS Łódź team in 1922, becoming its key defender four years later. Gałecki represented this team until 1939, participating in more than 400 games. In many of them, he was the team captain.

He wore the Polish National Team jersey for 22 games. His debut took place on 27 October 1928 in Prague, against Czechoslovakia.

During the 1936 Berlin Olympics, Gałecki was a key defender on the Polish team, participating in all games (3-0 vs Hungary, 5-4 vs Great Britain, 1-3 vs Austria and 2-3 vs Norway). Poland finished in 4th place.

In 1937-38 Gałecki played in qualifying matches for the 1938 World Cup football match. In Warsaw, Poland beat Yugoslavia 4–0. In the second leg, in Belgrade, the Poles lost 0–1, but Poland qualified due to the goals advantage. Gałecki represented Poland in a legendary World Cup game against Brazil on 5 June 1938 in Strasbourg, France. The Poles lost 5–6, but the match is to this day regarded as one of the best performances of the Polish National Team.

Called to active military duty in August 1939, Gałecki fought in the September 1939 Campaign. He was held prisoner in a POW camp in Eger, Hungary, but managed to escape through Yugoslavia and Greece and reached Palestine, where he became a soldier of the Polish 2nd Corps. Gałecki fought at Tobruk and Monte Cassino. After the war, Gałecki returned to his hometown in 1947.

He died in Łódź.

See also
 Polish Roster in World Cup Soccer France 1938

References

External links
 
 

1906 births
1958 deaths
Footballers from Łódź
People from Piotrków Governorate
Polish footballers
ŁKS Łódź players
Poland international footballers
Olympic footballers of Poland
Footballers at the 1936 Summer Olympics
1938 FIFA World Cup players
Polish military personnel of World War II
Association football defenders
Polish prisoners of war in World War II